The Ultimate Fighting Championship III (later renamed UFC 3: The American Dream) was a mixed martial arts (MMA) event held by the Ultimate Fighting Championship (UFC) on September 9, 1994, at Grady Cole Center in Charlotte, North Carolina, United States. The event was seen live on pay-per-view in the United States, and was later released on home video.

History
UFC 3 used an eight-man tournament format, with the winner receiving $60,000. The tournament had no weight classes or weight limits. Each match had no time limit or rounds; therefore no judges were used for the night. Competitors could only win a match by submission, throwing in the towel, knockout, or referee stoppage. This event marked the first time the referee was given the authority to stop the contest. The referee for the night was once again "Big" John McCarthy. 

Replacement fighter Steve Jennum won the tournament by defeating Harold Howard via submission due to strikes, despite only fighting in the finals. Jennum was a replacement for Ken Shamrock, who made it to the finals but withdrew due to injury. This was the first UFC tournament that was not won by Royce Gracie, who won his quarterfinal fight but withdrew as the semifinal fight was about to start, likely due to fatigue from the previous round. After Jennum won UFC 3 as an alternate, UFC instituted alternate qualifying bouts to balance out fatigue, and to lessen the advantage that alternates previously had entering the tournament without fighting quarterfinal bouts.

Results

UFC 3 bracket

1Keith Hackney was forced to withdraw due to injury. He was replaced by Felix Mitchell.
2Royce Gracie's corner threw in the towel before the fight, so Harold Howard was given a bye into the final.
3It was announced that Ken Shamrock was injured at the event and could not continue. Steve Jennum replaced him.

See also 
 Ultimate Fighting Championship
 List of UFC champions
 List of UFC events
 1994 in UFC

References

External links
UFC 3 results at Sherdog.com
UFC 3 fights reviews
Official UFC website
 MMA Mental History UFC 3

Ultimate Fighting Championship events
1994 in mixed martial arts
Mixed martial arts in North Carolina
Sports competitions in Charlotte, North Carolina
1994 in North Carolina